Felipa Sánchez, la soldadera, is a Mexican telenovela produced by Televisa and originally transmitted by Telesistema Mexicano in 1967.

Cast 
Elvira Quintana as Felipa Sánchez
Eric del Castillo
Óscar Morelli
María Eugenia Ríos

References

External links 

Mexican telenovelas
Televisa telenovelas
Spanish-language telenovelas
1967 telenovelas
1967 Mexican television series debuts
1967 Mexican television series endings